Killing Peace: Colombia's Conflict and the Failure of U.S. Intervention is a 2002 book by Garry Leech which documents the four-decade armed conflict in Colombia.

Details

Killing Peace: Colombia's Conflict and the Failure of U.S. Intervention,
by Garry M. Leech. Published by the Information Network of the Americas (INOTA), 2002,
Paperback, 116 pages with photos. .

Description

Over the past half-century, Colombia has been plagued by violence—its people caught in the middle of a civil conflict raging between the army, leftist guerrillas, right-wing paramilitaries, narco-traffickers, and U.S. anti-drug warriors. Killing Peace: Colombia's Conflict and the Failure of U.S. Intervention provides an overview of the war that is ravaging Colombia including its root causes in the country's gross social and economic inequalities.

Though rarely in the headlines, Colombia is not only by far the largest recipient of U.S. military aid in the Western Hemisphere, it is also the worst human rights catastrophe. The rampaging process of economic globalization is further brutalizing the war-weary Colombian people.

History of Colombia
Books about globalization
Books about foreign relations of the United States
Colombia–United States relations
Non-fiction books about Colombian drug cartels
2002 non-fiction books